Dublin is a surname. Notable people with the surname include:

 Dion Dublin (born 1969), English television presenter and footballer
 George Dublin (born 1977), Antiguan footballer
 Keith Dublin (born 1966), English footballer
 Louis Israel Dublin (1882–1969), Lithuanian-American statistician